Eupithecia nodosa is a moth in the family Geometridae. It is found in China.

References

Moths described in 1984
nodosa
Moths of Asia